Murray Sutherland (born 10 April 1953 in Edinburgh) is a former Scottish boxer who fought in middleweight division. He was boxing's inaugural, lineal and first undisputed world Super-Middleweight champion, having won the inaugural IBF's version in 1984.

Professional boxing record

|-
|align="center" colspan=8|48 Wins (40 knockouts, 8 decisions), 14 Losses (7 knockouts, 7 decisions), 1 Draw 
|-
| align="center" style="border-style: none none solid solid; background: #e3e3e3"|Result
| align="center" style="border-style: none none solid solid; background: #e3e3e3"|Record
| align="center" style="border-style: none none solid solid; background: #e3e3e3"|Opponent
| align="center" style="border-style: none none solid solid; background: #e3e3e3"|Type
| align="center" style="border-style: none none solid solid; background: #e3e3e3"|Round
| align="center" style="border-style: none none solid solid; background: #e3e3e3"|Date
| align="center" style="border-style: none none solid solid; background: #e3e3e3"|Location
| align="center" style="border-style: none none solid solid; background: #e3e3e3"|Notes
|-align=center
|Loss
|48–14–1
|align=left| Lindell Holmes
|TKO
|3
|25 February 1986
|align=left| Sterling Heights, Michigan, United States
|align=left|
|-
|Win
|48–13–1
|align=left| Mike Hyman
|KO
|2
|15 November 1985
|align=left| Greensboro, North Carolina, United States
|align=left|
|-
|Loss
|47–13–1
|align=left| Bobby Czyz
|UD
|10
|26 July 1985
|align=left| Atlantic City, New Jersey, United States
|
|-
|Win
|47–12–1
|align=left| Lloyd Richardson
|KO
|3
|31 May 1985
|align=left| Wheeling, West Virginia, United States
|align=left|
|-
|Win
|46–12–1
|align=left| Robert Pew
|TKO
|2
|1 March 1985
|align=left| Atlantic City, New Jersey, United States
|align=left|
|-
|Win
|45–12–1
|align=left| Lenny Edwards
|TKO
|3
|9 February 1985
|align=left| Port Huron, Michigan, United States
|align=left|
|-
|Win
|44–12–1
|align=left| Wilford Scypion
|TKO
|12
|8 December 1984
|align=left| Phoenix, Arizona, United States
|align=left|
|-
|Win
|43–12–1
|align=left| Joe Byrd, Jr.
|TKO
|3
|24 October 1984
|align=left| Saginaw, Michigan, United States
|
|-
|Loss
|42–12–1
|align=left| Chong-Pal Park
|KO
|11
|22 July 1984
|align=left| Seoul, South Korea
|align=left|
|-
|Win
|42–11–1
|align=left| Ernie Singletary
|UD
|15
|28 March 1984
|align=left| Atlantic City, New Jersey, United States
|align=left|
|-
|Win
|41–11–1
|align=left| Joe Brewer
|KO
|2
|24 February 1984
|align=left| Wichita, Kansas, United States
|align=left|
|-
|Loss
|40–11–1
|align=left| James Kinchen
|UD
|10
|19 November 1983
|align=left| Saint Joseph, Missouri, United States
|align=left|
|-
|Win
|40–10–1
|align=left| Alex Ramos
|UD
|10
|13 September 1983
|align=left| Atlantic City, New Jersey, United States
|align=left|
|-
|Loss
|39–10–1
|align=left| Tommy Hearns
|UD
|10
|10 July 1983
|align=left| Atlantic City, New Jersey, United States
|
|-
|Win
|39–9–1
|align=left| Jean-Marie Emebe
|TKO
|9
|27 May 1983
|align=left| Providence, Rhode Island, United States
|
|-
|Win
|38–9–1
|align=left| Johnny Heard
|KO
|5
|5 March 1983
|align=left| Bay City, Michigan, United States
|align=left|
|-
|Draw
|37–9–1
|align=left| Robbie Sims
|PTS
|10
|4 February 1983
|align=left| Worcester, Massachusetts, United States
|
|-
|Loss
|37–9
|align=left| JB Williamson
|MD
|10
|10 December 1982
|align=left| Las Vegas, Nevada, United States
|align=left|
|-
|Win
|37–8
|align=left| Mario Maldonado
|SD
|10
|23 November 1982
|align=left| Atlantic City, New Jersey, United States
|align=left|
|-
|Win
|36–8
|align=left| Fred Reed
|KO
|1
|21 October 1982
|align=left| Saginaw, Michigan, United States
|align=left|
|-
|Win
|35–8
|align=left| Tony Mundine
|UD
|10
|6 September 1982
|align=left| Brisbane, Queensland, Australia
|
|-
|Win
|34–8
|align=left| Ron Ayers
|KO
|2
|12 August 1982
|align=left| Bay City, Michigan, United States
|align=left|
|-
|Win
|33–8
|align=left| Gonzalo Montes
|TKO
|7
|24 July 1982
|align=left| Houston, Texas, United States
|align=left|
|-
|Loss
|32–8
|align=left| Eddie Davis
|TKO
|6
|11 June 1982
|align=left| Las Vegas, Nevada, United States
|align=left|
|-
|Loss
|32–7
|align=left| Michael Spinks
|TKO
|8
|11 April 1982
|align=left| Atlantic City, New Jersey, United States
|align=left|
|-
|Win
|32–6
|align=left| Chris Wells
|KO
|1
|13 February 1982
|align=left| Atlantic City, New Jersey, United States
|align=left|
|-
|Win
|31–6
|align=left| Henry Sims
|TKO
|9
|15 December 1981
|align=left| Chicago, Illinois, United States
|
|-
|Win
|30–6
|align=left| Darnell Hayes
|KO
|1
|9 September 1981
|align=left| Lansing, Michigan, United States
|
|-
|Win
|29–6
|align=left| James Williams
|UD
|12
|29 July 1981
|align=left| Saginaw, Michigan, United States
|align=left|
|-
|Loss
|28–6
|align=left| Matthew Saad Muhammad
|KO
|9
|25 April 1981
|align=left| Atlantic City, New Jersey, United States
|align=left|
|-
|Win
|28–5
|align=left| Fred Brown
|KO
|6
|27 February 1981
|align=left| Lansing, Michigan, United States
|align=left|
|-
|Win
|27–5
|align=left| Rocky Mack
|KO
|3
|13 February 1981
|align=left| Iowa City, United States
|align=left|
|-
|Win
|26–5
|align=left| John Beverage
|KO
|1
|5 December 1980
|align=left| Columbus, Ohio, United States
|align=left|
|-
|Win
|25–5
|align=left| Pablo Paul Ramos
|PTS
|12
|25 October 1980
|align=left| Pontiac, Michigan, United States
|align=left|
|-
|Win
|24–5
|align=left| Phil Wade
|KO
|3
|4 October 1980
|align=left| Des Moines, Iowa, United States
|align=left|
|-
|Win
|23–5
|align=left| Joey Butcher
|KO
|1
|13 September 1980
|align=left| Milwaukee, Wisconsin, United States
|align=left|
|-
|Win
|22–5
|align=left| John Cox
|KO
|2
|12 September 1980
|align=left| Milwaukee, Wisconsin, United States
|align=left|
|-
|Win
|21–5
|align=left| Stanley Scott
|KO
|2
|15 August 1980
|align=left| Muskegon, Michigan, United States
|align=left|
|-
|Win
|20–5
|align=left| Benny Mitchell
|KO
|3
|11 August 1980
|align=left| Grand Rapids, Michigan, United States
|align=left|
|-
|Win
|19–5
|align=left| Johnny Townsend
|TKO
|6
|1 August 1980
|align=left| Council Bluffs, Iowa, United States
|align=left|
|-
|Win
|18–5
|align=left| Greg Payne
|TKO
|6
|19 July 1980
|align=left| Tampa, Florida, United States
|align=left|
|-
|Loss
|17–5
|align=left| Michael Spinks
|UD
|10
|4 May 1980
|align=left| Kiamesha Lake, New York, United States
|align=left|
|-
|Win
|17–4
|align=left| Eddie Smith
|KO
|4
|13 April 1980
|align=left| Huntington, Indiana, United States
|align=left|
|-
|Win
|16–4
|align=left| Don Addison
|TKO
|4
|8 March 1980
|align=left| Detroit, Michigan, United States
|align=left|
|-
|Win
|15–4
|align=left| Julius Noble
|TKO
|4
|1 February 1980
|align=left| Chicago, Illinois, United States
|
|-
|Win
|14–4
|align=left| Gus Turner
|KO
|5
|26 January 1980
|align=left| Lansing, Michigan, United States
|align=left|
|-
|Win
|13–4
|align=left| Al Bell
|KO
|2
|15 January 1980
|align=left| Pensacola, Florida, United States
|align=left|
|-
|Win
|12–4
|align=left| Jose Gutierrez
|KO
|2
|2 January 1980
|align=left| Bay City, Michigan, United States
|align=left|
|-
|Win
|11–4
|align=left| Al Bolden
|PTS
|10
|9 December 1979
|align=left| Columbus, Ohio, United States
|align=left|
|-
|Win
|10–4
|align=left| Karl Zurheide
|TKO
|2
|9 November 1979
|align=left| Saginaw, Michigan, United States
|align=left|
|-
|Loss
|9–4
|align=left| Richie Kates
|PTS
|10
|21 July 1979
|align=left| Pontiac, Michigan, United States
|align=left|
|-
|Win
|9–3
|align=left|Harold Riggins
|KO
|2
|4 March 1979
|align=left| Saginaw, Michigan, United States
|align=left|
|-
|Win
|8–3
|align=left| Rick Jester
|KO
|1
|31 January 1979
|align=left| Saginaw, Michigan, United States
|align=left|
|-
|Win
|7–3
|align=left| Bill Hollis
|KO
|3
|4 December 1978
|align=left| Saginaw, Michigan, United States
|align=left|
|-
|Win
|6–3
|align=left| Gary Alexander
|PTS
|8
|17 October 1978
|align=left| Canton, Ohio, United States
|align=left|
|-
|Win
|5–3
|align=left| Zach Page
|KO
|3
|29 September 1978
|align=left| Hamilton, Ontario, Canada
|align=left|
|-
|Win
|–3
|align=left| Harold Riggins
|KO
|6
|27 May 1978
|align=left| Brantford, Ontario, Canada
|align=left|
|-
|Win
|3–3
|align=left| Ivy Cory
|KO
|2
|5 May 1978
|align=left| Flint, Michigan, United States
|align=left|
|-
|Loss
|2–3
|align=left| Dwight Davison
|KO
|4
|21 April 1978
|align=left| Cleveland, Ohio, United States
|align=left|
|-
|Win
|2–2
|align=left| Gus Turner
|TKO
|4
|5 April 1978
|align=left| Cleveland, Ohio, United States
|align=left|
|-
|Win
|1–2
|align=left| Tony Curovic
|TKO
|3
|1 February 1978
|align=left| Cleveland, Ohio, United States
|align=left|
|-
|Loss
|0–2
|align=left| Willie Featherstone
|TKO
|3
|17 January 1978
|align=left| Toronto, Ontario, Canada
|
|-
|Loss
|0–1
|align=left| Kevin Downey
|UD
|6
|18 August 1977
|align=left| Halifax, Nova Scotia, Canada
|align=left|
|}

External links 
 

|-

 

 

1954 births
International Boxing Federation champions
Living people
Middleweight boxers
Scottish male boxers
Boxers from Edinburgh